Rod MacSween is the founder and CEO of International Talent Booking (ITB). He was known for bringing artists such as: The Who, Pink Floyd and Robert Plant’s Band of Joy to the University of Exeter. While studying there, in 1969, he was elected secretary of the Students Guild.

Biography
MacSween was born in Southampton, England to parents were both academics.

Recognition 
In 2015, MacSween received a Classic Rock Roll of Honor (VIP) Award. In 2019 the academic institution awarded him with an honorary doctorate degree for his contribution to the music world. Other artists he has represented over the years include: Aerosmith, Black Sabbath, Bon Jovi (and KISS), Def Leppard, Guns N' Roses, Lenny Kravitz, Maroon 5, Ozzy Osbourne, Pearl Jam, The Scorpions, Tool and The Who.

References 

Living people
Year of birth missing (living people)
Chief executives in the media industry
Alumni of the University of Exeter
English chief executives